Nemophas forbesi is a species of beetle in the family Cerambycidae. It was described by Waterhouse in 1884. It is known from the Moluccas.

References

forbesi
Beetles described in 1884